Rajaratha is a 2018 Indian Kannada-language romantic comedy film written and directed by Anup Bhandari, who also composed the film's music. It stars Nirup Bhandari and Avantika Shetty in the lead roles in their second collaboration with the director after the success of RangiTaranga. The film was dubbed in Telugu as Rajaratham (English: Royal Chariot) with Rana Daggubati replacing Puneeth Rajkumar as the narrator. Arya, who made his debut in Kannada cinema with the film, features in a supporting role alongside P. Ravishankar. While the film score is composed by B. Ajaneesh Loknath, the soundtrack is composed by Anup Bhandari. The cinematography is by William David.

The first look of the film was released in the social media by the team on 2 October 2017. The film was released on March 23, 2018.

Plot
The story starts in a bus named Rajaratha. Abhi (Nirup Bhandary) is the protagonist. He is a fun loving person and writing poems is his passion.  
Megha (Avanthika shetty), is his love interest. Her mother is a Tamilian and father is from Telangana. She was born in Kerala and brought up in Bangalore. Both are from the same college. Their past unfolds.  First time he sees her is during the time of his college admission. From then he is in love with her, but he is scared to reveal it. In the fourth semester he finds that she is in love with another guy from the same college named  Suraj. Back in the present  she befriends him. There is a parallel story running at the same time. It is about Vishwas (Arya) a member of political party named Praja Rakshana Dal. The leaders of the party were involved in scams. To disclose this issue the party draws the attention of people by claiming that Periyapelli which originally belongs to Tamil Nadu as Karnataka's. While in the protest Apanna, a prominent leader is slapped by Tamilian. Vishwa takes the leadership of the protest. Meanwhile, the bus is blocked in the middle of a forest. Megha and Abhi decide to go out to record a song. But they lost their way. It is then revealed to the audience that Vishwa and Abhi are siblings. Vishwa loves his brother dearly but does not show it. Then Abhi finds Megha in a jeep with two men who he presumes as kidnappers. He runs  after the vehicle and fights against them. Then she stops him and reveals that those are the assistants of her uncle (Ravishankar). After a humorous chat he decides to drop Megha and Abhi back to the bus. They stay in a resort for a day. Then it is revealed that most of the co-passengers in the bus are somehow connected in his life. In the meantime, Vishwa calls Abhi and asks him to get down in Bangalore and lies him that his father is not well. Believing this, Abhi agrees to do so. But he gets to know about the lie from his mother (Aruna Balraj). He returns to the bus. The bus reaches near Periapelli. He was about to propose to her giving the plastic ring which she liked in the jewelry shop. Rioters burn the vehicles, including the bus in which they were travelling. Later it is revealed that his brother was also a part of this violence. Abhi, getting to know this confronts him as to why is he doing all this. Abhi saves most of the passengers. He saves Megha when few tried to molest her. Later it is then revealed that a baby boy was stuck inside the bus. Megha goes to save the baby. Along with her Abhi also goes. They rescue the baby and hand it over to Vishwa. Then the bus explodes. The co-passengers and Vishwa cry. Here audience presume that they are dead. The movie ends with a note that violence is harmful. It leads to the death of our own loved ones. Media channels expose the politicians behind the Periapalli massacre. The people of Karnataka and Tamil Nadu do a candle march. Then movie takes a leap of 5 years. Vishwa is shown lighting a lamp in front of a photo of his friend. Here we see Megha (with slight burnt plastic ring in hand which Abhi was about to put on her) and Abhi living together happily. The burnt marks on their bodies were still visible. The boy, Aadhi who was saved by them comes to meet them. It is now revealed that the duo run an orphanage with the name of Rajaratha. The board of the bus is kept and used it as the name plate of the orphanage.

Cast
 Nirup Bhandari as Abhi
 Avantika Shetty as Megha
 Arya as Vishwa
 P. Ravishankar as Uncle
 Puneeth Rajkumar as Rajaratha (voice role)
 Vinaya Prasad as Usha owner of the jewelry shop
 M. G. Naresh as Tandav Murthy
 Srivatsa as Harsha
 Sanjay Suri
 Sudhakar Saaja as Abhi and Vishwas's Father
 Aruna Balraj as Abhi and Vishwas's Mother
 Sruthi Hariharan as media reporter (guest appearance)
 Anup Bhandari as a media reporter (guest appearance)

Telugu version
 Rana Daggubati as Rajaratham (voice only)

Soundtrack

Anup Bhandari has composed the songs and The background score was composed by B. Ajaneesh Loknath.

Controversy 
During Rajaratha promotions, director Anup Bhandari, his brother Nirup Bhandari and actress Avantika Shetty made derogatory comments against audience who didn't wish to watch the film. The trio issued an apology after Karnataka Film Chamber of Commerce (KFCC) condemned their comments.

References

External links
 

2018 films
2010s Kannada-language films
Indian romantic comedy films
Films shot in Mysore
2018 romantic comedy films